Golap Ma (Bengali: গোলাপ মা) was a direct householder disciple of Sri Ramakrishna, the 19th century mystic and saint, and a foremost companion of Sri Sarada Devi, his spiritual consort and the Holy Mother of Ramakrishna Order, along with her other constant companion Yogin Ma. Her real name was Annapurna Devi or Golap Sundari Devi. She was also referred as "grief stricken Brahmani" in the Gospel of Sri Ramakrishna. She played a very important role in the early development of Sri Ramakrishna movement and stayed until her death in Udbodhan, the house where the Holy Mother stayed in Calcutta. She was popular as Golap Ma (translation: Mother Golap) among the devotees of the Ramakrishna Order.

Early life
Very little is known about the early life of Golap Ma, except that she was born in a Brahmin family in the Baghbazar area of North Calcutta, probably in the 1840s. She was married and had a son and a daughter named Chandi. Chandi was married to Saurindra Mohan Tagore of the Tagore family in Pathuriaghata, Calcutta. However, she lost her husband, only son and daughter Chandi in quick succession and was grief-stricken on account of her loss. She was brought to Sri Ramakrishna by Yogin Ma, who was her neighbour.

Sri Ramakrishna's influence 
She met Sri Ramakrishna in 1885 in a grief-stricken state. He assuaged her grief and introduced her to Sri Sarada Devi. She soon became an intimate companion of the latter.  Women Saints of East and West, by swami Ghanananda, published by Vedanta Press, Hollywood, 1955 Sri Ramakrishna on one occasion visited the house of Golap Ma, on 28 July 1885, as recorded in the Gospel of Sri Ramakrishna. Golap Ma was one of the major women disciples of Sri Ramakrishna and could render him personal service in the form of carrying his food and cleaning his room. 
During Sri Ramakrishna's illness, she provided dedicated service to him as the constant companion of Sri Sarada Devi, first in Shyampukur and then in Cossipore.

As companion of Sri Sarada Devi 
After the passing away of Sri Ramakrishna, Golap Ma accompanied Sri Sarada Devi to the holy places of Varanasi and Vrindavan. Afterwards she was one of the first to report the abject poverty of Sri Sarada Devi in Kamarpukur and was instrumental in bringing her to Calcutta in 1888. Sri Sarada Devi used to affectionately call her as "Vijaya" and Yogin Ma as "Jaya". She stayed with Sarada Devi whenever the latter stayed in Calcutta and accompanied her to Puri and later to Rameswaram, Madras and other places in South India. Subsequently, when the Udbodhan house was constructed for the Holy Mother, by Swami Saradananda, Golap Ma came to stay there permanently. She also traveled to Jayrambati, Sarada Devi's village. As constant companion of Sri Sarada Devi, Golap Ma used to perform many of the household chores and also served as a major point of interaction with her devotees. Sri Sarada Devi used to speak through her to some of the male devotees, including Swami Vivekananda. As a constant companion of Sarada Devi, she had the unique opportunity of seeing and interacting with her from a very close quarter and therefore was a major source of information on her life and activities.

Last years 

She was kind and charitable and during her last years was preoccupied with her spiritual practices. Half of her income was spent for the charity to the poor and needy.  Sarada Devi had said that "Golap has attained spiritual illumination through japam (repeating the name of God)". Her life was simple but austere. She was literate and could study the scriptures like Mahabharata and Bhagavad Gita

After Sri Sarada Devi died on 21 July 1920, Golap Ma, together with Yogin Ma and Swami Saradananda became the spiritual mainstay for her devotees. She died on 19 December 1924.

References

External sources
 They Lived with God, by Swami Chetanananda, published by Vedanta Society of St. Louis

Ramakrishna Mission
19th-century Hindu religious leaders
20th-century Hindu religious leaders
Hindu female religious leaders
Swami Vivekananda
1864 births
1924 deaths
Scholars from Kolkata